Eumseong County (Eumseong-gun) is a county in North Chungcheong Province, South Korea, best known for being the birthplace of former UN Secretary-General Ban Ki-moon. 

Eumseong Clean Peppers Festival is held in Eumseong-gun, Chungbuk every September. It has been held since 1982. It is held along with the Seolseong Cultural Festival. Events such as chili pepper fairy, Mr. chili pepper contest, fireworks, and county people's singing contest will be held together with events such as masquerade, torch relay, demonstration event, folk game, and athletic competition. Since 2009, the Eumseong Clean Pepper Lady Contest has been held instead of the Red Pepper Fairy Contest.

History
Eumseong County is composed of two towns (eup) and seven townships (myeon), with a total population of 98,619 people (including foreigners) as of March 31, 2013. The most central town is Geumwang (which also goes by the name Muguk). 
Although Jincheon-gun and Chungbuk Innovation City are jointly attracted to each other, they have the advantage that infrastructure is concentrated in areas that are promoted to the city first, so they are forming a rivalry with the leadership of Chungbuk Innovation City.

Many farmers live in Eumseong County.  They host two cultural festivals: the Pumba (traditional vagabond) Festival (품바축제) in the spring and the Gochu (chili pepper) Festival (고추축제) in the fall.  Eumseong is famous in Korea for its production of high-quality red chili peppers. Eumseong is also renowned for its strawberries, ginseng, watermelon, and beef.

Eumseong County is home to three different high schools.  Eumseong High School is located in the city of Eumseong, Chungbuk Semi-Conductor High School is located in Geumwang, and Maegoe High School is located in Gamgok.  Maegoe is a Catholic all girls middle school as well as a mixed gender high school located at the base of a steep sided hill under a Christ-shaped statue. In addition, GVCS, an English-speaking Christian boarding school, is located in the city of Eumseong.

There are two institutes of higher education in Eumseong county that are both located in the township Gamgok - Far East University and Gangdong College.  Far East University is a four-year school while Gangdong College has only a two-year program. As of 2013, 20 to 30 foreign English teachers live in Eumseong County, who are from countries including the United States of America, Canada, South Africa, England, and Scotland.

The name "Eumseong" means "shaded castle" and is not to be confused with its homonym "human voice".

In 1956, Eumseong's status was promoted from township to town. In 1973, Geumwang's status was also promoted to that of a town.

Historically, the area of 'Eumseong' was limited to the current Eumseong-eup and Wonnam-myeon areas, and all other towns and villages were the areas of Chungju.

Population 
 Eumseong-gun CI Eumseong-gun, Chungcheongbuk-do Population Trend
(1966~present)
 125,108 in 1966
 1970 112,716
 111,142 in 1975
 1980 96,311 people
 1985 83,379 people
 74,674 in 1990
 1995 83,682 people
 87,956 in 2000
 85,969 people in 2005
 91,093 people in 2010
 96,396 people in 2015
 93,153 in 2020
 August 2022 92,277 people
Population is based on the administrative district for the year, not the current administrative district, the maximum value in the graph is 200,000 people
1966-1990: National Statistical Office Census, 1995-Present: Resident Registration Population Statistics of Ministry of Public Administration and Security

Climate
Eumseong has a monsoon-influenced humid continental climate (Köppen: Dwa) with cold, dry winters and hot, rainy summers.

Samseong 

Samseong is located in the northwest of Eumseong County, just east of the Jungbu Expressway.
The township's bus terminal has connections to Dong Seoul station that take about 1.5 hours as well as connections to other provincial cities and towns.

Samseong has a middle school, an elementary school and several private academies or hagwons. The township is arranged principally around one street, which comprises a covered market, CU, 7 Eleven, Paris Baguette, and many Korean restaurants and hofs.

There are rice paddies between the various factories. In addition there are two sizeable lakes and a mountain named Mai San which is excellent for hiking.

Known for spotting wildlife, Samseong was formerly a prime location for encountering species now thought to be endangered.

Sister cities
 Gangdong-gu, Seoul
 Taizhou, Jiangsu, China

References

External links
Eumseong county government website, in English

 
Counties of North Chungcheong Province
음성 우미린 풀하우스